Allan dos Santos (born in Nova Iguaçu, state of Rio de Janeiro on July 17, 1983) is a Brazilian conservative journalist.
He grew up in Madureira, a neighborhood in the city of Rio de Janeiro.

At the age of 14 he converted to Roman Catholicism. At 18, he spent a year helping the Toca de Assis Franciscan community with its homelessness relief action.

In 2014 he started the YouTube channel Terça Livre, which later became the biggest Conservative media enterprise in South America. It was ended in 2021 by order of the supreme Court of Brazil.

The influencer is the target of investigations that are being processed by the Federal Supreme Court (STF) about the existence of a digital militia to attack democracy and institutions. Allan has resided in the United States since 2020.

References

External links 
Twitter

Gettr

Official website

Brazilian journalists

Brazilian anti-communists
Converts to Roman Catholicism from Protestantism
Brazilian Catholics
Brazilian emigrants to the United States
Far-right politics in Brazil
Fugitives wanted by Brazil
Living people
1983 births
People from Nova Iguaçu